The Turk Shahis or Kabul Shahis were a dynasty of Western Turk, or mixed Turko-Hephthalite, origin, that ruled from Kabul and Kapisa to Gandhara in the 7th to 9th centuries AD. 
They may have been of Khalaj ethnicity. The Gandhara territory may have been bordering the Kashmir kingdom and the Kanauj kingdom to the east. From the 560s, the Western Turks had gradually expanded southeasterward from Transoxonia, and occupied Bactria and the Hindu-Kush region, forming largely independent polities. The Turk Shahis may have been a political extension of the neighbouring Western Turk Yabghus of Tokharistan. In the Hindu-Kush region, they replaced the Nezak Huns – the last dynasty of Bactrian rulers with origins among the Xwn (Xionite) and/or Huna peoples (who are sometimes also referred to as "Huns" who invaded Eastern Europe during a similar period).

The Turk Shahis arose at a time when the Sasanian Empire had already been conquered by the Rashidun Caliphate. The Turk Shahis then resisted for more than 250 years to the eastward expansion of the Abbasid Caliphate, until they fell to the Persian Saffarids in the 9th century AD. The Ghaznavids then finally broke through into India after overpowering the declining Hindu Shahis and Gurjaras.

Kabulistan was the heartland of the Turk Shahi domain, which at times included Zabulistan and Gandhara.

Territorial extents 
The Turks under the Western Turk ruler Tong Yabghu Qaghan crossed the Hindu-Kush and occupied Gandhara as far as the Indus river from circa 625 AD. Overall, the territory of the Turk Shahi extended from Kapisi to Gandhara, with a Turkic branch becoming independent in Zabulistan at one point. The Gandhara territory may have been bordering the Kashmir kingdom and the Kanauj kingdom to the east. The Turk Shahi capital of Gandhara, which possibly fonctionned as a winter capital alternating with the summer capital of Kabul, was Udabhandapura. The Korean pilgrim Hui Chao, visiting the area in 723-729 AD, mentioned that these regions were ruled by Turk kings.

History

Establishment: Arab offensive and displacement of the Nezaks 
The last extant Nezak ruler Ghar-ilchi was recorded as the king of Jibin (former Kapisi/ Kabulistan) by the Tang dynasty in 653 AD. He was also likely to be the unnamed ruler who was confirmed as Governor of Jibin under the newly formed Chinese Anxi Protectorate in 661 CE and would broker a peace-treaty with the Arabs, the same year. Nonetheless, in 664-665 CE, Abd al-Rahman ibn Samura launched an expedition to reconquer the territories lost during the Caliphate Wars. Kabul was occupied in 665 CE after a siege of a few months but soon revolted, only to be reoccupied after another year-long siege. These events mortally weakened the Nezaks though their ruler — not named in sources — was spared upon converting to Islam.

Sometime soon (666/667 - ?), the Nezaks were replaced by the Turk Shahis, first in Zabulistan and then in Kabulistan and Gandhara. Their ethnic identity remain unclear and the name might be a misnomer. According to Hyecho, who visited the region about 50 years after the events, the first Shahi ruler of Kapisi — named Barha Tegin by Al-Biruni — was an usurper, who used to be a military commander in the service of the last Nezak King. Al-biruni provides a rather-legendary account of Barhategin's rise extrapolating from multiple mythological motifs and the precise circumstances surrounding the dawning of Turk Shahis remain unclear.

Tang Protectorate and vassalage to the Tokhara Yabghus 

The Turk Shahis, like the rest of the Western Turks, were nominally part of a protectorate under the Chinese Tang dynasty since circa 658 AD. The territory of the Turk Shahis was nominally partitioned into several Chinese Commanderies under administration of the Anxi Protectorate: the city of Yege (modern Mihtarlam) east of Kabul was considered as the seat of a Chinese Commandery for the Jibin country, and named the Xiuxian Commandery (修鮮都督府, Xiūxiān Dūdùfû), the city of Yan at the border with Gandhara was the seat of the Yuepan Commandery (悅般都督府, Yuèpān Dūdùfû), Ghazni was the seat of the Tiaozhi Commandery (條枝都督府, Tiáozhī Dūdùfû).

According to Chinese sources, in particular the chronicles of the Cefu Yuangui, the Turks in Kabul were vassals of the Yabghus of Tokharistan, who in turn swore allegiance to the Tangs. A young brother of the Tokhara Yabghu Pantu Nili—named Puluo (僕羅 púluó in Chinese sources)—visited the court of the Tang dynasty in Xi'an in 718 AD and gave an account of the military forces in the Tokharistan region, explaining that "two hundred and twelve kingdoms, governors and prefects" had been recognizing the authority of the Yabghus (specifically mentioning among them that "the king of Zabul rules two hundred thousand soldiers and horses, the king of Kabul two hundred thousand"), since the time of his grandfather, that is, probably since the time of their establishment.

Conflict with the Arabs 

Under Barha Tegin, the Shahis mounted a counter-offensive and repulsed the Arab forces after Abd al-Rahman ibn Samura was replaced as Governor of Sistan c.665 CE, taking back lost territory as far as the region of Arachosia and Kandahar. The capital was shifted from Kapisa to Kabul. The Arabs attempted a counter-offensive when Rabi ibn Ziyad al-Harithi assumed the governorship of Sistan in 671 CE, attacking the Turkic "Rutbil" at Bost, and driving him to al-Rukhkhaj (Arachosia). Rabi's successor Ubayd Allah ibn Abi Bakra continued the war upon being appointed in 673 CE, leading Rutbil to negotiate a peace treaty for both Kabul and Zabul, in which the governor of Sistan acknowledged control of these territories by Rutbil and the King of Kabul. Little more is known about the rule of Barha Tegin, but many of the early Turk Shahi coins are attributed to him.

He was succeeded by his son Tegin Shah c. 680, whose regal title was "Khorasan Tegin Shah" meaning "Tegin, King of the East", probably referring to his resistance against the Umayyad caliph. His territory comprised the area from Kabulistan to Gandhara and initially included Zabulistan, which came to be ruled by Rutbil (Turkic: Iltäbär), his elder brother, who founded the dynasty of the Zunbils. Their relationship was at times antagonistic, but they fought together against Arab incursions.

The Arabs again failed to capture Kabul and Zabulistan in 683 AD: their general Abu Ubaida ibn Ziyad was imprisoned in Kabul and Governor of Sijistan Yazid ibn Ziyad was killed as he attacked the city. In 684–685, Kabul briefly comes under Arab control. In 698 Ubayd Allah ibn Abi Bakra of the Umayyad Caliphate lead an 'Army of Destruction' against the Zunbils, was defeated and was forced to offer a large tribute, give hostages including three of his sons and take an oath not to invade Zunbil again. About 700 Ibn al-Ash'ath tried again to invade with the 'Peacock Army', but after some initial progress eventually formed a peace treaty with the Turks, and turned around to lead a rebellion against the Umayyad viceroy of the east, al-Hajjaj ibn Yusuf.

Tegin Shah apparently regained complete suzerainty over Zabulistan around 710 CE. This appears from the accounts in the Chinese chronicles, which relates that the rulers of Zabulistan "subjugated themselves to Jibin (Kabul)", sometime between 710 and 720 CE. During this period, it seems the Zunbils and the Turk Shahis intermittently accepted, or were forced to accept, payment of taxes to the Arabs, thereby acknowledging some form of political dependence, but resisted fiercely when the Arabs attempted to take a more direct military, political or religious control.

From 711 CE, the Turk Shahis also had to face a Muslim threat from the southeast, as the campaigns of Muhammad ibn Qasim established the Caliphal province of Sind, as far as Multan, at the gates of Punjab, which would last until 854 CE as an Ummayad and then Abbasid dependency.

Tang dynasty investiture 
In 719/20 CE, the Tegin of Kabulistan (Tegin Shah) and the Iltäbär of Zabulistan (here named "Shiquer") sent a combined embassy to Xuanzong, the Chinese Emperor of the Tang dynasty in Xi'an, to obtain confirmation of their thrones. The Chinese emperor signed an investiture decree, which was returned to the Turk rulers. The official Chinese recognition of the enthronement of Tegin Shah appears in the annals of the Tangshu:

The word "Geluodazhi" in this extract (Chinese: 葛罗达支, pronounced in Early Middle Chinese: kat-la-dat-tcǐe), is thought to be a transliteration of the ethnonym Khalaj. Hence Tegin Shah was described as "Tegin of the Khalaj". This title also appears on his coinage in Gupta script, where he is named "hitivira kharalāča", probably meaning "Iltäbär of the Khalaj".

In 720 CE, the ruler of Zabulistan (謝䫻, Xiėyù) also received the title Gedaluozhi Xielifa (Chinese: 葛達羅支頡利發), Xielifa being the known Chinese transcription of the Turkish "Iltäbär", hence "Iltäbär of the Khalaj". This appears in another extract from the Tangshu describing the country of Zabulistan (谢䫻, Xiėyù), mentioning how Zabulistan was a vassal to the Kabul Shah around the same period, and how the Zunbil ruler, named "Shiquer", was also recognized by the Chinese court:

These two Chinese accounts tend to confirm that the Turk Shahi and Zunbil rulers were Khalaj Turks. The Korean pilgrim Hyecho accompanied the return embassy in 726 AD, and wrote an account of his travel and visit at the court of Kabul, relating that Turk ("T’u-chüeh") kings ruled the territories of Gandhara, Kapisa and Zabulistan at the time, that they were Buddhists, and that the King of Kabul was the uncle of the ruler of Zabul.

Victory over the Arabs 

In 739 CE, Tegin abdicated in favour of his son Fromo Kesaro:

"Fromo Kesaro" is probable phonetic transcription of "Rome Caesar". He was apparently named in honor of "Caesar", the title of the then East Roman Emperor Leo III the Isaurian who had defeated their common enemy the Arabs during the Siege of Constantinople in 717 AD, and sent an embassy to China through Central Asia in 719 AD which probably met with the Turk Shahis. In Chinese sources "Fromo Kesaro" was aptly transcribed "Fulin Jisuo" (拂菻罽娑), "Fulin" (拂菻) being the standard Tang dynasty name for "Byzantine Empire" and Jisuo (罽娑) the phonetic transcription of "Caesar":

Fromo Kesaro appears to have successfully fought against the Arabs. His coinage suggests that the Arabs were defeated and forced to pay tribute to Fromo Kesaro, since Sasanian coins and coins of Arab governors were overstruck by him on the rim with the following text in the Bactrian script:

Since these coins did not come out from Fromo Kesaro's foundries, but were simply pre-existing Arab/Sasanian coins which he overstruck on the rim with his victorious legends in Bactrian, it would seem that in all likelihood the coins underwent this rather simple overstriking procedure in the field, probably during one of his victorious campaigns against the Muslims.

Fromo Kesaro's victories may have forged parts of the epic legend of the Tibetan King whose name appears to be phonetically similar: Phrom Ge-sar.

Dissolution of the Tang protectorate 

In 745 AD, Fromo Kesaro's son Bo Fuzhun (勃匐準 Bo Fuzhun in Chinese sources) became the king, as recorded in the Old Book of Tang; he was simultaneously conferred with the Tang title "General of the Left", which probably alludes to a strategic relationship between the Chinese and the Turk Shahis, in the context of expanding Islamic frontiers.

The Chinese departed from the region c. 760 AD, following their strategic defeat at the Battle of Talas (751 AD) and the events of the An Lushan Rebellion, thus weakening the geopolitical position of the Turk Shahis. Al-Yakubhi records that c. 775–785, a Turk Shahi ruler of Kabul—variously reconstructed as Ḥanḥal/Khinkhil/Khingil/Khingal—was sent a proposal by Al-Mahdi (775-785), the third Abbasid Caliph, asking for his submission, to which he conceded. He was either a unique ruler of the Turk Shahis or identical with Bo Fuzhun.

Renewed conflict with the Arabs and decline 

The struggle between the Arabs and the Turk Shahis continued into the 9th century AD. Hoping to take advantage of the Great Abbasid Civil War (811-819 AD), the Turk Shahi, named "Pati Dumi" in Arab sources, invaded parts of Khorasan. Once the Abbasid caliph Al-Ma'mun prevailed in the Civil War, he sent troops to confront the Turk invaders: in 814/815 AD, the Turk Shahis were soundly defeated by these Arab troops, which pushed as far as Gandhara. The Turk Shah now had to convert to Islam, and had to pay an annual tribute of 1,500,000 dirhams and 2,000 slaves to the Abbasid governor of Khorasan. He also ceded a large and precious idol made of gold, silver and jewels, which was sent to Mecca. Following Al-Azraqi's initial account of 834 AD, Quṭb ed-Dîn wrote:

Al-Azraqi also made a very detailed description of the statue, which points to a crowned and bejewelled Buddha seated on a throne, a design otherwise well known and quite specific to this historical period for the region of Afghanistan and Kashmir. In the south, the Zunbil Turk Shahis escaped unaffected and continued to rule for about two more decades, before falling in 870/871 AD to the Saffarids under an upstart adventurer Ya'qub ibn al-Layth al-Saffar.

Takeover by the Hindu Shahis (822 CE)

According to the Arab chronicler al-Biruni, the last Turk Shahi ruler of Kabul, Lagaturman—probable son of Pati Dumi—was deposed by a Brahmin minister, named Kallar around 822 AD. A new dynasty, the Hindu Shahi took over, with its capital in Kabul. To the south, the Zunbils held fort against Muslim forces until the Saffarid offensive of 870 CE.

Society and Religion 

The Alchon Huns, predecessors of the Turk Shahis in Afghanistan and Gandhara, had brought destruction upon Buddhism. When Chinese pilgrim Xuanzang visited northwestern India in  AD, he reported that Buddhism had drastically declined, and that most of the monasteries were deserted and left in ruins. The Turk Shahis are reported as having been supporters of Buddhism, and are generally presented as Buddhists. There was a renewed patronage of Buddhism in the area of Afghanistan during the 7-8th century AD as a function of the expansion of the Tang dynasty power in Central Asia at that time, just as the Arabs were pressuring Khorasan and Sistan. The Korean pilgrim Hui Chao in 726 AD recorded in the Chinese language that the Turkic (突厥, Tū-chuèh) rulers of Kapisa ("Jibin") followed the Triratna and dedicated many Buddhist temples:

The Kingdoms of Central Asia, often Buddhist or with an important Buddhist community, were generally under the formal control of the Tang dynasty, had regular exchanges with China, and expected Tang protection. Chinese monks were probably directly in charge of some of the Buddhist sanctuaries of Central Asia, such as the temple of Suiye (near Tokmak in present-day Kirghizistan). During this period too, the Chinese Tang Empire extended its influence and promotion of Buddhism to the kingdoms of Central Asia, including Afghanistan, with a corresponding influx of Chinese monks, while there was conversely a migration of Indian monks and artistic styles from India to Central Asia, as "Brahmanical revivalism" was pushing Indian Buddhist monks out of their country.

According to the Chinese pilgrim Wukong, who arrived in Gandhara in 753 AD, the country of Kapisi had its eastern capital in Gandhara during the winter, and its capital in Kapisi during the summer. In Kashmir, which he visited from 756 to 760 AD, he explained that Buddhist temples were dedicated by the Tü-kiu ("Turk") kings. Brahmanism too seems to have flourished, but to a lesser extent, under the Turk Shahis, with various works of art also attributed to their period.

At the end of the 10th century, the Samanid Empire led by the Turk ghulams Alp Tigin established itself in Eastern Afghanistan, later followed by the Ghaznavid dynasty. At that time, local Buddhist Turk communities seem to have mingled with the newly arrived Muslim Turks of the Samanid Empire, forming an ethnic continuity among the ruling class of Ghazni. The local Buddhist Turks progressively islamized, but there was a continuation in artistic development and Buddhist religious activities, not a break. The Buddhist site of Qol-i Tut in Kabul remained in use until the end of the 11th century.

Coinage 

From the middle of the 7th century AD, the Turk Shahis emulated the coinage of their predecessors, the Hunnish Nezak-Alchons. The first coins of the Turk Shahi kept the winged bull's head of the Nezak as well as their legend "King of Nezak" (nycky MLKA) but in corrupted Pahlavi script. But the style of the rulers in the coins was now quite different, and the coins were of markedly higher silver quality. Soon, these coins introduced a new legend in replacement of the "King of Nezaks" legend, using the Indian honorific "Shri" ("Perfection") with the royal title "Shahi" in the Bactrian language (Srio šauoi) and in Sanskrit (Śri Sāhi). This new coinage corresponds to the formal establishment of the Turk Shahis, sometime after 661 AD.

In later stages, the crown adorned with a bull's head is replaced by a crown consisting in three crescent moons in the middle of which a flower or trident is set. Often the bull's head in the crown is also replaced by the symbol of a lion's or a wolf's head. In other coins the triple-crescent moons were kept, and the king was shown wearing a Central Asian caftan.

Many of these coins are attributed to Shahi Tegin, the second Turk Shahi ruler, and dated to circa 700 AD. After this transitory period, Turk Shahi coinage adopted the Sasanian coinage style, and added a trilingual legend in Greco-Bactrian, Pahlavi, and Brahmi. Based on finds, Turk Shahi coins apparently circulated in Zabulistan, Kabulistan, Gandhara and Uddiyana.

Art
There was a relatively high level of artistic activity in the areas controlled by the Turk Shahis during 7-8th centuries CE, either as a result of the Sasanian cultural heritage, or as a result of the continued development of Buddhist art, with possible Hephthalite influence. The destruction upon Buddhism wrought by their predecessors had deeply weakened the Hellenitic-Buddhist art of Gandhara. Yet, consequent to Tang patronage of Buddhism, a Sinicized-Indian phase re-developed during the 7th to 9th century CE. The Western Turks in Afghanistan are generally associated with a major revival of Gandharan Buddhist art between the 7th and 9th century CE, especially in the areas of Bamiyan, Kabul and Ghazni, with major new Buddhist sites such as Tapa Sardar in Ghazni, or Tepe Narenj and Mes Aynak near Kabul, which remained active at least until the 9th century CE. This process and chronology are visible in the archaeological site of Tapa Sardar near Ghazni in Afghanistan, while this new form of art appears in its mature state in Fondukistan.

Buddhist works of art
The works of art of this period in eastern Afghanistan, with a sophistication and iconography comparable to other works of art of the Silk Road such as those of Kizil, are attributable to the sponsorship of the "cosmopolitan" Turks, rather than their "Ephthalite" predecessors in this area (the Nezak-Alchon Huns), who, in the words of Edmund Bosworth, "were not capable of such work". And, soon after, the expansion of Islam made the creation of such works of art impossible.

The style as well as the techniques used in making these works of art (modelling of clay mixed with straw, wool or horsehair), are characteristic of the paintings and sculptures of Central Asia. The production of Fondukistan must correspond to the southernmost expansion of this particular type of Buddhist art. The new region occupied by the Turk Shahis had numerous Buddhist monasteries, such as Mes Aynak, which appear to have remained in use until the 9th century CE. Dedications including Turk Shahis coins have been found under a statue in the Buddhist monastery of Fondukistan.

Devotees or sponsors wearing Central Asian clothes such as the tight-fitting double-lapel caftan appear in the Buddhist Monastery of Fondukistan, as in the statue of a King wearing the caftan and pointed boots, seated together with a Queen of Indian type, and dated to the 7th century CE.

Dedications including coins of the Buddhist Turk Shahis and one Sasanian coin of Khusro II have been found under the statue of the royal couple with a king in Turk attire in the monastery of Fondukistan, providing important insights regarding the datation of the statue as well as Buddhist art in general: as a result of the analysis the statue can be dated to after 689 CE, and as a consequence a date of circa 700 CE is generally given for it and the other works of art of Fondukistan. The royal couple consists in a princess in "Indian" dress, and a prince "wearing a rich caftan with double lapel and boots", characteristic of Central Asian clothing.

Hindu works of art

Hinduism too seems to have flourished to some extent under the Turk Shahis, with various works of art also attributed to their period. In particular the famous statue of a Sun deity that is either Mitra or Surya in tunic and boots discovered in Khair Khaneh near Kabul, as well as a statue of Ganesha from Gardez are now attributed to the Turk Shahis in the 7-8th century CE, and not to their successors the Hindu Shahus as formerly suggested. In particular, great iconographical and stylistic similarities with the works of the Buddhist monastery of Fondukistan have been identified. Archaeologically, the construction of the Khair Khaneh temple itself is now dated to 608-630 CE, at the beginning of the Turk Shahis period.

The marble statue of Ganesha from Gardez is now attributed to the Turk Shahis, and was donated by a certain "Śrī Ṣāhi Khiṃgāla", possibly the Turk Shahi king named "Khingala" who according to Al-Yakubhi gave his submission to Al-Mahdi in 775–785 CE.

See also

 History of Afghanistan
 Umayyad campaigns in India
 Muslim conquests in the Indian subcontinent

Notes

References

Sources

  
 

 

 
 
 

 

 

 
 
 

 

Turkic dynasties
Dynasties of Afghanistan
Kabul Shahi
Central Asian Buddhist kingdoms